Normie Osborn is a fictional character in Marvel Comics. He is the grandson of Norman Osborn and the eldest son of Harry Osborn.

Publication history

Normie Osborn first appeared in The Amazing Spider-Man #263 (April 1985), and was created by Bill Mantlo and Al Milgrom. He appeared in Green Goblin stories throughout the 1990s, generally portrayed as hating Spider-Man.

Fictional character biography
Normie Osborn is the child of Liz Allan and Harry Osborn and the grandson of Norman Osborn.

Harry's sanity recovered shortly before dying from a modified version of the Goblin formula, saving Spider-Man and saying "You're my best friend"; Normie is shown overhearing this, possibly changing his view of Spider-Man. While still recovering from his father's death, Normie is befriended by Peter Parker, a sort of surrogate uncle to him. A trio of robotic "Goblin women" (one of a number of failsafes prepared by Harry before death) kidnap Normie, intending to turn him into a new Green Goblin. Spider-Man and the Molten Man (Normie's uncle) defeat them before he can be exposed to the Goblin formula.

Norman Osborn returned from the dead, using a robot Goblin to kidnap his heir. This version appears as the standard Green Goblin, and causes Normie to believe his father has returned. This is part of a complex ploy to increase Norman's visibility by playing the unfortunate grandfather.

Norman dismisses the possibility of his grandson being his heir (the new Goblin), saying that Normie has the same weaknesses as Harry.

Normie is seen in a Sensational Spider-Man issue playing baseball, being watched from the stands by the Molten Man and the Chameleon, while Electro is in the shadows. No harm comes to Normie, but the Chameleon uses his safety as a bargaining chip to bring the Molten Man into his plan to attack Spider-Man after the hero's recent unmasking.

Normie reappears after the One More Day storyline. Now Normie hates his father for supposedly abandoning him when Harry was mistakenly believed dead while being high on the Goblin serum. His hatred for Spider-Man is also reignited.

Osborn's re-establishes himself as a major crime lord called the Goblin King, undergoing plastic surgery to also establish himself as a businessman named Mason Banks to provide a suitable inheritance for his grandson, with Liz apparently helping Norman in this endeavor.

When Osborn acquires the Carnage symbiote and transforms into the Red Goblin, Osborn attempts to gain his grandson Normie's aid by infusing a portion of the Carnage symbiote into Normie, turning into "Goblin Childe". Despite the symbiote amplifying Normie's jealousy of his half-brother Stanley, Normie throws off its influence when he witnesses his grandfather try to kill his parents, realizing in the process that the villain was actually his own grandfather and not Spider-Man. The symbiote fragment is subsequently separated from Normie while the main symbiote is apparently destroyed during the final battle between Red Goblin and Spider-Man. It is implied that Liz and Mark kept at least some of the symbiote in storage for some future use. However, it showed that some of the symbiote still remained in his body, swirling in the boy's eye.

When Cletus Kasady was resurrected by a cult who worships the fallen symbiotic god Knull and obtain his power to unleash chaos on Earth, Normie begin to feel its fearful presence and got help from Spider-Man and Eddie Brock, and brought to the Maker where he meets Eddie Brock's son Dylan Brock. He also learn Spider-Man's true identity being his father's friend, Peter Parker.

When it was revealed that Harry Osborn became the demon Kindred, Harry briefly visited Normie while he was sleeping. Upon realizing his father has suddenly becoming too suspicious and no longer his usual-self, Normie found out his father is being succumbed back into insanity as Norman had. It proves to be true when the kid found out that Harry had been preparing the Goblin weapons. He helped Peter to show Liz the truth of Harry's current condition, by showing the prepared Goblin weapons hidden behind his father's closet, not long before his recently cured grandfather arrive to warn Peter of the Inner Demons attack on F.E.A.S.T..

Other versions

MC2

In the MC2 alternate future, little Normie Osborn is all grown up. A sensitive boy, he took his mother's remarrying hard, never getting along with his stepfather, Foggy Nelson (until after her death when the two finally bonded), and he held Peter Parker responsible for the death of his father and grandfather. When his mother became ill and died, Normie broke down, accepting his father's and grandfather's mantle as the Green Goblin as his destiny, seemingly convincing himself that his grandfather was a benevolent man driven to violence by the 'demon' of Spider-Man. His appearance as the Green Goblin forced May Parker to adopt the mantle of Spider-Girl. His first few appearances met with failure as he was continually defeated by Spider-Girl, Phil Urich (as the Golden Goblin), and even in one instance by Mary Jane Parker. Then one day, when May had temporarily lost her powers, Normie kidnapped her, unmasked her, tied her up and taunted her with a knife, ranting about their 'destined' family history of opposition. May realized that Normie was hoping she would break free and kill him. At this time, May was able to convince him to go get help and to forsake the Goblin legacy.

Normie reformed, and even helped May continue on as Spider-Girl during her temporary power loss by lending her his goblin equipment (Normie also confided in her that he was actually acrophobic). He later also helped Phil Urich return to costume as the good Green Goblin. For a time, Normie converted one of his grandfather's old Goblin hideouts into a kind of "batcave" from which May and Phil could use as a base of operations, which he christened "the Website." However, the Website was later located and destroyed by Canis' people.

While in group therapy (for former supervillains), he began dating Brenda Drago (the daughter of Blackie Drago), much to the chagrin of May who had developed a crush on him. During the events of the Season of the Serpent storyline, May confessed her feelings to Normie, but Normie did not think it would be appropriate. However, after he is shot in the chest by Mr. Nobody in the Marked For Death arc (who shot him to mess with May's head), Normie's true feelings are revealed in a coma vision where his grandfather taunts him, "All you had to do was kill the girl. But no you had to fall in love with her, and how's that working out for you, Normie?" The vision of Norman also taunts him that "you will never truly be rid of me."

His relationship with Brenda became rocky for a time when Élan DeJunae appeared to inform him of their betrothal which had been arranged by her father and Norman when Normie and Élan had just been children. Normie was not thrilled with the news, and Élan decided it was up to her to make sure that Normie was true to the family legacy. First, she attempted to expose him to the Goblin chemicals, but she was foiled by Spider-Girl. Normie was submerged in the chemicals for a long time, but he said the doctors gave him a clean bill of health. Next Élan objected to his wedding to Brenda by literally crashing it. She forcibly bonded the Venom symbiote to him as a "wedding gift." The new Venom went on a rampage until Normie with the help of Spider-Girl was able to gain control of the symbiote. May told him to cast it into the fire, but Normie could not bring himself to kill it. "I overcame the Goblin legacy, I should be able to control a simple alien symbiote." It looks as if Normie wishes to use the symbiote to be a hero. However, he is apparently afraid of a repeat of what happened on what was supposed to be his wedding day. He told his secretary Kristy Watson (Normie's nanny growing up, cousin of MJ), that if the alien ever takes control of him again, to have Spider-Girl destroy him.

His superhero persona does not have a name yet. They object to being referred to as Venom (because Venom was the symbiote with Eddie Brock) or as Normie (he would like to keep his identity secret) while out patrolling but "all the good ones [names] are already taken." For a time he considered using the name Dusk. When in control of the symbiote, Normie resembles Spider-Man's black costume with four additional arms.

When the Avengers came to arrest him for harboring the Venom symbiote, the cyborgized Jim Rhodes short-circuited (claiming that Tony Stark murdered him) and went on a rampage in New York City. In the end, Normie with the Venom symbiote saved the day because he was the only one who did not hold back—he snared Rhodes with the symbiote and then grabbed onto a live wire from inside a streetlight, electrocuting both himself and Rhodes, with the short-circuiting Rhodes falling first. Afterwards, he informed them that Raptor is a government agent and so "surrendered" to her custody. He voluntarily joined Kaine's team of reformed supervillains on the condition that Raptor (who does not get along with Whedon, its director) may be allowed to quit.

When Brenda is viciously wounded in an attack by the Hobgoblin, he joins Spider-Girl in the hunt for the Hobgoblin. They discover that the Hobgoblin's entire purpose is to lure Spider-Girl to a group of assassins known as the Scriers, and Spider-Girl is impaled by one of their swords. Osborn and the symbiote lash out, killing several of the Scriers with symbiote-constructed blades, causing the Scriers to momentarily retreat (this momentarily lapse would become his and Kaine's little secret). Then, Normie with the symbiote saves Spider-Girl when Osborn transfers the symbiote to her. It heals her wounds and removed the blade's poison from her system. While Spider-Girl with the symbiote go on to hunt down Hobgoblin, Kaine and Normie are besieged by more Scriers. They are later joined by Spider-Girl and Peter Parker (back in costume). The battle is halted however when the Scriers are called off by the Black Tarantula, who had just assumed control of their organization.

The symbiote had been vulnerable when Peter Parker rejected it, and it was corrupted by the hate and anger of the second host (Eddie Brock). When it bonded to Normie Osborn, it was changed by his loving nature. When the symbiote gives its life to protect Spider-Girl and her father from the Hobgoblin, Normie felt it die.
 
Normie and Brenda return, and Normie agrees to fund an operation to restore most of the hearing of May's baby brother, Benjamin Parker.

Normie summons Peter to an old Oscorp warehouse, and reveals a girl in a tank, discovered during his travels abroad, and says that SHE may be the real May Parker. In the next issue, Normie shows Peter his grandfather's journal, which states that he kidnapped May and arranged to have a clone of her returned to the Parkers. With the veracity of the journal in question, Normie and Peter attempt to discover the truth without informing May of their discovery and its possible implications. Normie visits Élan DeJunae and questions her without success; although her body language at the mention of "Project: Changeling" implies that she knows something, she is unwilling to talk. Later on at the warehouse, Peter (with Normie present) draws some fluid from the tank in order to run some tests on it. Peter realizes too late that the fluid has become unstable from exposure to air—it explodes in his face to Normie's distress.

The girl is later awoken by a recently escaped Fury, and assaults Normie before making her escape.

Appearance/tattoos
While he was the Green Goblin, Normie got several tattoos. The tattoo on his back read "Honor Thy Father/Kill the Spider."  The tattoo on his chest read "Revenge" and has a spider impaled with a knife. He also had scars on his wrists from his suicide attempt. The Venom symbiote removed all of his tattoos and scars as it died, as a parting gift.

Amazing Spider-Man: Renew Your Vows
In the pages of Amazing Spider-Man: Renew Your Vows, Normie inherits the entire Oscorp company sometime after Harry's death at ten years old and takes on the name Norman Osborn II. Despite his age, he is a cold, calculating, and relentless CEO similar to his grandfather. When the Spider Family makes their debut, he becomes fascinated with the youngest member of the group, Spiderling. Due to Liz being in charge of Allan Biotech, he is taken care of by his personal assistant, Miss January, who reports to Liz about Normie's behavior. Despite no longer being close to him, Liz attempts to make sure Normie doesn't follow the same path as his father and grandfather. However, blaming the death of his father on Spider-Man, Normie constructs a giant Green Goblin Mech to take Peter Parker and his family down. It is later revealed that Normie was manipulated by Miss January, who pilots the Goblin Mech and coerced Normie into building it to avenge Harry. Normie assists Spiderling in destroying the mech from the inside. He thanks Spiderling for helping him gain his life back.

After the incident, Spiderling becomes his first close friend. As they grew up, they saw each other less as Normie's life did get better and more normal despite him still running the company. Eight years later, he takes a more cautious approach for his latest experiments with gene therapy to avoid the incidents caused by his father and grandfather, though he is still a target of enemies as a result of their legacy (though Spiderling does assist in protecting him time to time). He is determined to make the world a better place to redeem the Osborn name, but is unaware that his lead scientist is secretly Mister Sinister who uses his resources to create various clones of the Spider family to attack the X-Men. Normie uses a smaller version of the Goblin mech to assist the Spider Family and the X-Men in defeating Mister Sinister, but his exposure to Sinister's chemicals causes him to grow an additional four arms.

References

External links
 Normie's profile 616
 
 

Comics characters introduced in 1985
Fictional businesspeople
Fictional characters from New York City
Marvel Comics 2
Spider-Man characters
Green Goblin